A title is one or more words used before or after a person's name, in certain contexts. It may signify either generation, an official position, or a professional or academic qualification. In some languages, titles may be inserted between the first and last name (for example, Graf in German, Cardinal in Catholic usage (Richard Cardinal Cushing) or clerical titles such as Archbishop). Some titles are hereditary.

Types 

Titles include:
 Honorific titles or styles of address, a phrase used to convey respect to the recipient of a communication, or to recognize an attribute such as:
 Imperial, royal and noble ranks
 Academic degree
 Social titles, prevalent among certain sections of society due to historic or other reasons.
 Other accomplishment, as with a title of honor
 Title of authority, an identifier that specifies the office or position held by an official

Titles in English-speaking areas

Common titles
 Mr. – Adult man (regardless of marital status)
 Ms. – Adult woman (regardless of marital status)
 Mx. – Adult person (regardless of marital status), can be used to refer to non-binary people
 Mrs. – Married Adult woman (includes widows and divorcées)
 Miss – Unmarried Adult Woman or Female child
 Master – Male Child
 Madam (also Madame and Ma'am) – Formal form of address for an adult woman. Also used to denote a position of power or respect, opposite the usage of "Mister" for men, e.g. "Mister/Madam Ambassador".

Controversy around usage of common titles
Some people object to the usage of titles to denote marital status, age or gender. In 2018, a campaign named GoTitleFree was launched to encourage businesses to stop requesting, storing and using marital status titles in their registration forms, and when speaking with customers, launched on the grounds that titles often lead to assumptions about a woman's age or availability for marriage, and exclude non-binary people. This is in line with established practice advocated by the World Wide Web Consortium and the Government Digital Service which sets the standard for UK government online services. This in turn means that titles are optional on UK passports and driving licences.

Familial
Aunt, Auntie, or Uncle may be used as titles by nieces and nephews, or by children to adults whom they know.

Legislative and executive titles
 Hon. (Honourable) (for younger sons and daughters of barons) and. Rt. Hon. (Right Honourable) (for Privy Councillors), used in the United Kingdom

Some job titles of members of the legislature and executive are used as titles.
MP, for members of the Parliament
MYP, for members of the UK Youth Parliament
 Representative
 Senator
 Speaker
 President (from which comes such titles as Deputy President, Executive Vice President, Lord President of the Council, and Vice President)
 Councillor
 Youth Councillor (YC)
 Alderman/Selectman
 Delegate
 Mayor and related terms such as Lady Mayoress and Lord Mayor
 Governor and Lieutenant Governor
 Prefect
 Prelate
 Premier
 Burgess
 Ambassador
 Envoy
 Secretary, Cardinal Secretary of State, Foreign Secretary, General Secretary, Secretary of State, and other titles in the form "Secretary of..." in which Secretary means the same thing as Minister
 Attaché
 Chargé d'affaires
 Provost
 Minister (from which comes such titles as Prime Minister and Health Minister)

Aristocratic titles

 Prince/Princess – From the Latin princeps, meaning "first person" or "first citizen". The title was originally used by Augustus at the establishment of the Roman Empire to avoid the political risk of assuming the title Rex ("King") in what was technically still a republic.  In modern times, the title is often given to the sons and daughters of ruling monarchs. Also a title of certain ruling monarchs under the Holy Roman Empire and its subsidiary territories until 1918 which is still used in Liechtenstein, (Monaco still uses the title Prince to this day, even though it was not a part of the Holy Roman Empire) and in Imperial Russia before 1917. The German title is Fürst ("first"), a translation of the Latin term; the equivalent Russian term is князь (knyaz). 
 Archduke/Archduchess – A title derived from the Greek Archon ("ruler; higher") and the Latin Dux("leader").  It was used most notably by the Habsburg Dynasty that ruled Austria and Hungary until 1918.
 Grand Duke/Grand Duchess – "Big; large" + Latin Dux (leader).  A variant of "Archduke", used particularly in English translations Romanov Dynasty Russian titles. Also used in various Germanic territories until World War I. Still survives in Luxembourg.
 Duke/Duchess – From the Latin Dux, a military title used in the Roman Empire, especially in its early Byzantine period when it designated the military commander for a specific zone.
 Marquis or Marquess/Marquise or Marchioness – From the French marchis, literally "ruler of a border area", (from Old French marche meaning "border"); exact English translation is "March Lord", or "Lord of the March".
 Count/Countess - From the Latin comes meaning "companion".  The word was used by the Roman Empire in its Byzantine period as an honorific with a meaning roughly equivalent to modern English "peer".  It became the title of those who commanded field armies in the Empire, as opposed to "Dux" which commanded locally based forces.
 Earl (used in the United Kingdom instead of Count, but the feminine equivalent is Countess) – From the Germanic jarl, meaning "chieftain," the title was brought to the British Isles by the Anglo-Saxons and survives in use only there, having been superseded in Scandinavia and on the European continent.
 Viscount/Viscountess - From the Latin vicarius ("Deputy; substitute".  Hence "vicar" and prefix "vice-") appended to Latin comes.  Literally: "Deputy Count".
 Baron/Baroness - From the Late Latin Baro, meaning "man, servant, soldier". The title originally designated the chief feudal tenant of a place, who was in vassalage to a greater lord.

In the United Kingdom, "Lord" and "Lady" are used as titles for members of the nobility. Unlike titles such as "Mr" and "Mrs", they are not used before first names except in certain circumstances, for example as courtesy titles for younger sons, etc., of peers. In Scotland "Lord of Parliament" and "Lady of Parliament" are the equivalents of Baron and Baroness in England.

 Lord – From Old English hlāford, hlāfweard, meaning, literally, "bread-keeper", from hlāf ("bread") + weard ("guardian, keeper") and by extension "husband, father, or chief".  (From which comes modified titles such as First Sea Lord and Lord of the Manor.)  The feminine equivalent is Lady from the related Old English hlǣfdīġe meaning, literally, "bread-kneader", from hlāf ("bread") + dīġe ("maid"), and by extension wife, daughter, or mistress of the house.  (From which comes First Lady, the anachronistic Second Lady, etc.)
 Emperor/Empress – From the Latin Imperator, meaning he/she who holds the authority to command (imperium).
 King/Queen – Derived from Old Norse/Germanic words.  The original meaning of the root of "king" apparently meant "leader of the family" or "descendant of the leader of the family," and the original meaning of "queen," "wife".  By the time the words came into English they already meant "ruler". 
 Tsar/Tsarina (Tsaritsa) – Slavonic loan-word from Latin.
 Caesar – The name of Julius Caesar taken by his heir Augustus and thereafter by Augustus' successors as Roman Emperor through the fall of Constantinople in 1453. Loaned into German as Kaiser.
 Leader – From Old English lædan, meaning "to guide". The head of state of North Korea is titled Great Leader. The de facto head of state of Iran is titled Supreme Leader.
Chief – A variation of the English "Prince", used as the short form of the word "Chieftain" (except for in Scotland, where "Chieftain" is a title held by a titleholder subordinate to a chief). Generally used to refer to a recognised leader within a chieftaincy system. From this come the variations paramount chief, clan chief and village chief. The feminine equivalent is Chieftess.

 PopessThe title of a character found in Tarot cards based upon the Pope on the Roman Catholic Church. As the Bishop of Rome is an office always forbidden to women there is no formal feminine of Pope, which comes from the Latin word papa (an affectionate form of the Latin for father). The mythical Pope Joan, who was reportedly a woman, is always referred to with the masculine title Pope, even when her female identity is known. Further, even if a woman were to become Bishop of Rome it is unclear if she would take the title Popess. A parallel might be drawn with the Anglican Communion, whose female clergy use the masculine titles of priest and bishop as opposed to priestess or bishopess.Nonetheless some European languages, along with English, have formed a feminine form of the word pope, such as the Italian papessa, the French papesse, the Portuguese papisa, and the German Päpstin.

Titles used by knights, dames, baronets and baronetesses
These do not confer nobility.
 Sir – Used by knights and baronets
 Dame – Used by dames and baronetesses

"Sir" and "Dame" differ from titles such as "Mr" and "Mrs" in that they can only be used before a person's first name, and not immediately before their surname.

 Chevalier (French)
 Cavaliere (Italian)

Judicial titles
 Advocate
 Advocate General AG
 Attorney
 Bailiff
 Barrister
 Chancellor C (of the High Court)
 Judge and Admiralty Judge
 Justice J
 Lord Chief Justice CJ (of the judiciary)
 Lord Justice Clerk
 Lord Justice of Appeal LJ (of the Court of Appeal)
 Justice of the Peace
 Magistrate and Promagistrate
 Master of the Rolls MR (of the Court of Appeal)
 Member and Chairman, for members of quasi-judicial boards
 Mufti and Grand Mufti
 Notary
 President P (of the Queen's/King's Bench Division) or President P (of the Family Division)
 Lord President of the Court of Session
 Privy Counsellor (or Privy Councillor) PC (of Her Majesty's Most Honourable Privy Council)
 Queen's Counsel QC (King's Counsel KC when monarch is male)
 Solicitor

Historical
 Lictor
 Reeve
 Seneschal
 Tribune

Ecclesiastical titles (Christian)
Titles are used to show somebody's ordination as a priest or their membership in a religious order. Use of titles differs between denominations.

Religious
 Abbess
 Abbot
 Caliph
 Brother – also for monks
 Friar
 Mother, Mother Superior, and Reverend Mother
 Reverend
 Sister – for religious sisters and nuns

Priests
Christian priests often have their names prefixed with a title similar to The Reverend.

 Bishop (from which come Archbishop, Boy Bishop, Lord Archbishop, Metropolitan Bishop, and Prince Bishop)
 Presbyter
 Priest (from which comes High Priest. The feminine equivalent is Priestess.)
 Father (Fr.)
 Patriarch
 Pope
 Catholicos
 Vicar
 Chaplain
 Canon
 Pastor
 Prelate
 Primate
In Brazil, it is used for bishops.
 Cardinal
 Ter (title) – Used by Armenian priests.

Used for deceased persons only
 Servant of God
 Venerable
 Blessed
 Saint (abbreviated S. or St.)

Other
 Christ – Greek translation of Hebrew מָשִׁיחַ (or Messiah), commonly used to refer to Jesus of Nazareth
 Deacon and Archdeacon
 Acolyte
 Dean
 Elder
 Minister
 Monsignor
 President (in the Church of Jesus Christ of Latter-day Saints)
 Reader
 Almoner and Lord High Almoner (Christian)
 Apostle
 Prophet
 Teacher
 Seventy
 Evangelist
 High Priest
 Great (Lord) Father of all churches

Academic titles

 Dr. – Short for doctor, a title used by those with doctoral degrees, such as DPhil, MD, DO, DDS, PhD, EdD, DCN, DBA, DNP, PharmD, DVM, and LLD. Those with JD degrees, although technically allowed, do not use this as a title by convention.
 Prof. – Professor
 Doc. – Docent
 EUR ING – Short for European Engineer, an international professional qualification and title for highly qualified engineers used in over 32 European countries.

Military titles
Military ranks are used before names.

 Admiral (from which come Grand Admiral, Fleet Admiral, Lord High Admiral, Rear Admiral, and Vice Admiral)
 Brigadier
 Captain (from which comes Group Captain)
 Colonel (from which comes Lieutenant Colonel)
 Commander (from which come Commander-in-Chief, Lieutenant Commander, and Wing Commander)
 Commodore (from which comes Air Commodore)
 Corporal (from which come Lance Corporal and Staff Corporal)
 General is usually used as a sort of shorthand for "general military commander". The term's far-reaching connotation has provoked its use in a very broad range of titles, including Adjutant General, Attorney General, Captain General, Colonel General, Director General, Generalissimo, General of the Army, Governor General, Lieutenant General, Lord Justice General, Major General, Resident General, Secretary General, Solicitor General, Surgeon General and Vicar General
 Lieutenant (from which come First Lieutenant, Flight Lieutenant and Lord Lieutenant)
 Major
 Marshal (from which comes Air Chief Marshal, Air Marshal, Air Vice Marshal and Field Marshal)
 Mate, more often titled as Chief Mate or First Mate
 Officer, a generic sort of title whose use has spread in recent years into a wide array of mostly corporate and military titles. These include Air Officer, Chief Academic Officer, Chief analytics officer, Chief Business Development Officer, Chief Credit Officer, Chief Executive Officer, Chief Financial Officer, Chief Information Officer, Chief Information Security Officer, Chief Knowledge Officer, Chief Marketing Officer, Chief Operating Officer, Chief Petty Officer, Chief Risk Officer, Chief Security Officer, Chief Strategy Officer, Chief Technical Officer, Chief Warrant Officer, Corporate officer, Customs officer, Field officer, First Officer, Flag Officer, Flying Officer, General Officer, Intelligence Officer, Junior Warrant Officer, Master Chief Petty Officer, Master Warrant Officer, Officer of State, Petty Officer, Pilot Officer, Police Officer, Political Officer, Revenue Officer, Senior Officer, Ship's Officer, Staff Officer, and Warrant Officer.
 Private, and many equivalent ranks depending on regiment.
 Sergeant (from which come Sergeant at Mace and Sergeant of Arms).

Maritime and seafarer's professions and ranks
The names of shipboard officers, certain shipping line employees and Maritime Academy faculty/staff are preceded by their title when acting in performance of their duties.
 Captain (nautical) – a ship's highest responsible officer acting on behalf of the ship's owner (Master) or a person who is responsible for the maintenance of the vessels of a shipping line, for their docking, the handling of cargo and for the hiring of personnel for deck departments (Port Captain). 
 Chief – a licensed mariner in charge of the engineering (Chief Engineer) or deck (Chief Mate or Officer) department
 Mate – licensed member of the deck department of a merchant ship (see Second Mate & Third Mate)
 Cadet – unlicensed trainee mate/officer or engineer under training

Law enforcement
The names of police officers may be preceded by a title such as "Officer" or by their rank.
 Constable (from which come Lord High Constable and Senior Constable)
 Agent
 Sergeant
 Officer
 Chief

Protected professional titles
In North America, several jurisdictions restrict the use of some professional titles to those individuals holding a valid and recognised license to practice. Individuals not authorised to use these reserved titles may be fined or jailed.  Protected titles are often reserved to those professions that require a bachelor's degree or higher and a state, provincial, or national license.

 Professional Engineer, Registered Engineer
 Professional Nurse, Registered Nurse, Nurse

Other organizations
Some titles are used to show one's role or position in a society or organization.
 Principal
 Nanny
 Coach
 Wizard, such as the Grand Wizard and Imperial Wizard of the Ku Klux Klan
 Brother or Sister
 Chief Scout (The Scout Association) – the head of The Scout Association
 King's Scout – title conferred upon a scout upon achieving highest attainable award achievable in the Scouting movement
 King's Guide – title conferred upon a guide upon highest attainable award for members of the Girl Guiding movement
 Scout, Eagle Scout

Some titles are used in English to refer to the position of people in foreign political systems
 Citizen, First Citizen
 Comrade

Non-English speaking areas

Default titles in other languages

 Note: Titles are seldom used in Sweden; people are usually referred to by their first name.

Rajput social titles

Titles used in Rajasthan and other neighbourhood states of India in honour of Rajputs (only):

Hukum – used in general to address any Rajput. Also used as suffix after following titles.
Daata – used for highest male member of a Rajput family.
Banna – used for Rajput boys.
Baisa – used for Rajput girls.
Babosa – used for eldest man of family. 
Bhabha – used for eldest woman of family.

Martial Arts
 Sensei - used for martial arts instructors
 Sempai - used for junior karate instructors and karate instructors in training
 Karate-ka - used for karate students
 Judge - used for the judges and referees at martial arts tournaments
 Master - used for kung-fu instructors or people who have studied the art their entire life

Academic
 Docent
 Doctorandus, abbreviated as drs.

Religious
 Ayatollah
 Bodhisattva
 Druid and Archdruid
 Hakham
 Buddha
 Hajji
 Imam
 Kohen
 Lama and the related Dalai Lama and Panchen Lama
 Mahatma
 Mahdi
 Mullah
 Nath
 Pastor
 Rabbi
 Rebbe
 Reverend
 Rosh HaYeshiva
 Saoshyant
 Sardar
 Sardarni
 Tirthankar
 Vardapet

Honorary titles
 Mahatma
 Oknha
 Pandit
 Sant
 Sheikh
 Swami
 Ustad

Rulers

 Chancellor (from which come Lord Chancellor and Vice-Chancellor)
 "Dear Leader" and "Supreme Leader" referred to Kim Jong-il as chief of North Korea. The title now refers to his son and successor Kim Jong-un. (친애하는 지도자, ch'inaehanŭn jidoja)
 Elder
 Emir/Emira – Arabic Prince/Princess
 Eze
 Maharajah
 Rajah
 Rai
 Dato
 Mwami
 Nizam
 Oba
 Obi
 Sultan/Sultana (title) – Arabic for "powerful ruler"
 Tor Tiv of Tiv
 Chief – origin of Chief of Staff, Chieftain, Clan Chief, Hereditary Chief, and War Chief. The present head of Samoa is titled a Paramount Chief
 Vizier and Grand Vizier
Stadtholder

Historical titles for heads of state
The following are no longer officially in use, though some may be claimed by former regnal dynasties.

Appointed
 Caesar (an honorific family name passed through Roman emperors by adoption)
 Legate
 Satrap
 Tetrarch

Elected or popularly declared
 Archon
Augustus (title)
 Caudillo
 Consul
 Decemvir
 Doge
 Duce
 Führer
 Imperator
 Lord Protector
 Roman dictator
 Triumvir

Hereditary
 Basileus
 Caliph
 Khagan
 Khan
 King-Emperor (the feminine equivalent is Queen-Empress)
 Malik
 Maharajah
 Rajah
 Rai
 Mikado
 Mirza
 Nawab
 Negus
 Patil
 Pharaoh
 Regina (the masculine form is Rex)
 Saopha
 Sapa Inca
 Shah
 Tsar

When a difference exists below, male titles are placed to the left and female titles are placed to the right of the slash.

 Africa
 Almamy – Fulani people of west Africa
 Asantehene – Ashanti, title of the King of the Ashanti People in Ghana
 Eze – Igbo people of Nigeria
 Kabaka – Baganda people of Buganda in Uganda
 Mwami – Kings of Rwanda and Burundi
 Negus – Ethiopia
 Oba – Yoruba people of Nigeria
 Omukama – Bunyoro, title of some Emperors/kings in Uganda
 Pharaoh – ancient Egypt
 Asia
 Arasan/Arasi – Tamil Nadu (India), Sri Lanka
 Arqa/Thagavor – King of Armenia
 Bayin – The title given to the king of pre colonial Burma
Maharajah/ Rajah/ Rai/ Chakarwarti Raja – India Sri Lanka
 Chogyal — "Divine Ruler" — ruled Sikkim until 1975
 Datu – pre-colonial Philippines
 Druk Gyalpo — hereditary title given to the king of Bhutan
 Engku or Ungku – Malaysia, to denote particular family lineage akin to royalty
 Hari – Filipino title for king
 Hoang De – Self-styled Vietnamese "emperor"; unified Vietnam
 Huángdì – Imperial China (Emperor)
 Hwangje – Self-styled Korean "emperor"; states that unified Korea
 Maha raja/feminine form is Maharani – Emperor, Empress India, Sri Lanka
 Meurah – Aceh before Islam
 Mirza, Persian/Iranian, Indian and Afghanistan and Tajikistan King
 Beg (Begzada or Begzadi, son-daughter of Beg), Baig or Bey in Under Mirza & using King or Military title.
 Patil  – meaning "head" or "chief" is an Indian title. The Patil is in effect the ruler of this territory as he was entitled to the revenues collected therefrom.
 Phrabat Somdej Phrachaoyuhua – King of Thailand (Siam), the title literally means "The feet of the Greatest Lord who is on the heads (of his subjects)" (This royal title does not refer directly to the king himself but to his feet, according to traditions.)
 Racha – Thailand, same meaning as Raja
 Raja – pre-colonial Philippines
 Raja – Malaysia, Raja denotes royalty in Perak and certain Selangor royal family lineages, is roughly equivalent to Prince or Princess
 Raja/Rani – Nepal King
 Rani – Nepali Queen
 Patabenda – Sub- king Sri Lanka
 Preah Karuna Preah Bat Sâmdech Preah Bâromneath – King of Cambodia Khmer, the title literally means "The feet of the Greatest Lord who is on the heads (of his subjects)" (referring not directly to the king himself but to his feet, according to tradition)
 Qaghan – Central Asian Tribes
 Saopha – Shan, king of Shan, today as a part of Myanmar
 Shahinshah or Padshah or Badshah- Persian/Iranian "King of Kings" or Persian rulers in Hindustan(India)
 Shah – Persian/Iranian and Afghanistan and Tajikistan King
 Sheikh – Arabic traditional regional leader, principalities of (Bahrain, Kuwait, Qatar, UAE)
 Sultan/Sultana – Arabic King (present Oman and former Ottoman Empire)
 Aceh, Brunei, Java, Oman, Malaysia, Sultan is the title of seven (Johor, Kedah, Kelantan, Pahang, Perak, Selangor, and Terengganu) of the nine rulers of the Malay states.
 Susuhanan – the Indonesian princely state of Surakarta until its abolition
 Syed – Islamic World, descendants of the Islamic prophet Muhammad
 Tennō or Mikado – Japan
 Shōgun – Japanese military dictator
 Sumeramikoto, Okimi – Japan, king
 Tengku – Malaysia, Indonesia, Tengku (also spelled Tunku in Johor, Negeri Sembilan, Kedah and Deli Sultanate of Indonesia is roughly equivalent to Prince or Princess
 Veyndhan, ko/Arasi – Tamil Nadu(India)
 Wang (King) – pre-Imperial China. In China, "king" is the usual translation for the term wang, 王.
 Wang – States of Korea that did not have control over the entire peninsula.
 Vuong – States in Vietnam that did not control the entire realm.
 Yang di-Pertuan Agong – Monarch of Malaysia, elected each five years among the reigning Sultan of each Malaysian state
 Europe
Autocrator – Greek term for the Byzantine Emperor
 Basileus – Greek ruler
 Despot, a Byzantine court title, also granted in the states under Byzantine influence, such as the Latin Empire, Bulgaria, Serbia, and the Empire of Trebizond.
 Domn (in Romanian)/Gospodar (in Old Slavonian) – Medieval Romania (Moldova, Wallachia)
 Fejedelem – Ancient/Medieval Hungarian
 Germanic king
 Großbürger/Großbürgerin (English: Grand Burgher) – historical German title acquired or inherited by persons and family descendants of the ruling class in autonomous German-speaking cities and towns of Central Europe, origin under the Holy Roman Empire, ceased after 1919 along with all titles of German nobility.
 Kaiser/Kaiserin – Imperial rulers of Germany and of Austria-Hungary
 Kniaz'/Knyaginya/Knez/Knjeginja (generally translated as "prince") – Kievan Rus'/Serbia
 Kunigaikshtis (Kunigaikštis) – Lithuanian, duke as in Grand Duchy of Lithuania.
 Rí, Rí túaithe, Ruiri, Rí ruireach, and Ard Rí – King, local king, regional overking, (provincial) king of overkings, and High King in Gaelic Ireland, also Scotland
 Tsar/Tsarina – the ruler of Imperial Russia
 Tsar/Tsaritsa – Bulgaria, pre-imperial Russia, Serbia
 Vezér – Ancient Hungarian
 Vojvoda (Serbian)/Vajda (Hungarian) – Serbian/Hungarian/Romany title
 Župan, sometimes Veliki Župan (Grand Župan) – Serbia, Croatia
 Oceania
 Chieftain – Leader of a tribe or clan.
 houeiki, matai, alii, tūlafale, tavana, ariki – usually translated as "chief" in various Polynesian countries.
 "Mo'i" – normally translated as King, used by Hawaiian monarchs since unification in 1810. The last person to hold that title was Queen Lili'uokalani.
 Tui or tui – there were/are also kings in Oceania (i.e. Samoa, Tonga, Wallis and Futuna, Nauru)

Aristocratic

Historical
Russian:
 Boyarin
 Dyak
 Knyaz (and Veliky Knyaz)
 Namestnik
 Okolnichy
 Posadnik
 Voyevoda

German:
 Burggraf
 Graf
 Freigraf
 Landgraf
 Markgraf
 Pfalzgraf
 Reichsgraf

Spanish:
 Don
 Hidalgo

Others:
 Augusta (Feminine equivalent of Augustus)
 Bitwoded (translates as Beloved)
 Comes
 Concubine (The Chinese imperial system, for instance, had a vastly complex hierarchy of titled concubines and wives to the emperor)
 Dejazmach (translates as Commander of the Gate)
 Fitawrari (translates as Leader of the Vanguard)
 Gentleman (used as a title in such forms as Gentleman at Arms, Gentleman of the Bedchamber, and Gentleman Usher. The feminine equivalent is Gentlewoman, or, in some circumstances, Lady.)
 Gerazmach (translates as Commander of the Left)
 Kenyazmach (translates as Commander of the Right)
 Ras (translates as Head)
 Sahib

Other

 Commissioner (from which come First Church Estates Commissioner and High Commissioner)
 Comptroller (from which Comptroller General and Comptroller of the Household)
 Courtier
 Curator
 Doyen
 Edohen
 Ekegbian
 Elerunwon
 Forester or Master Forester
 Headman
 Intendant (and the related Superintendent)
 Lamido
 Marcher or Lady Marcher
 Matriarch or Patriarch
 Prior, Lord Prior
 Pursuivant
 Rangatira
 Ranger
 Registrar (in a variant spelling in the title Lord Clerk Register)
 Seigneur (from which come Monsignor and the French common polite term Monsieur, equivalent to Mister)
 Sharif
 Shehu
 Sheikh
 Sheriff (from which comes High Sheriff)
 Subaltern
 Subedar
 Sysselmann
 Timi
 Treasurer, Master Treasurer and Secretary Treasurer
 Verderer
 Warden, Hereditary Warden, Lord Warden
 Woodman
 Bearer, such as Hereditary Banner Bearer, Standard Bearer, or Swordbearer
 Sayyid
 Apprentice
 Journeyman
 Adept
 Akhoond
 Arhat
 Bwana
 Goodman and Goodwife
 Grand Bard
 Mullah
 Sri
 Baba
 Effendi
 Giani or Gyani
 Guru
 Siddha
 Pir, Murshid

Historical
 Abuna
 Aedile
 Ali'i
 Aqabe sa'at (translates as Guardian of the Church Hours)
 Balambaras (translates as Fortress Commander)
 Bán
 Baig
 Bey
 Boyar
 Castellan
 Cellarer
 Censor
 Centurion
 Circuitor
 Commissar, often as People's Commissar
 Conquistador
 Daimyō
 Dey
 Dux
 Elector
 Gauleiter
 Guardian
 Ichege
 Infirmerer
 Inquisitor and Grand Inquisitor
 Jemadar
 Kitchener
 Mage
 Magister Militum
 Majordomo
 Maid – Archaic title denoting an unmarried woman, such as the character Maid Marian. Should not be confused with the general term for a young domestic worker housemaid girl. 
 Margrave
 Naib
 Officium
 Pasha
 Palatine (Ancient Rome, the Roman Catholic Church, Hungary (nádor), etc.)
 Pontiff and Pontifex Maximus
 Praetor
 Prebendary
 Quaestor
 Sacrist
 Samurai
 Shōgun
 Stadtholder
 Steward
 Thakore
 Voivode
 Viceroy (the feminine equivalent is Vicereine)

Post-nominal letters

Members of legislatures often have post-nominal letters expressing this:
 Member of Congress MC
 Member of Parliament MP
 Member of Youth Parliament MYP
Member of the European Parliament MEP
Member of the Scottish Parliament MSP
 Member of the Scottish Youth Parliament MSYP
Member of Provincial Parliament MPP
 Member of the National Assembly MNA
 Member of the House of Keys MHK
 Speaker of the House of Keys SHK
Member of the Legislative Council MLC
Member of the Legislative Assembly MLA
 Member of the House of Representatives Rep.
 Member of the House of Assembly MHA

University degrees
 Associate
 AA – Associate of Arts
 AAS – Associate of Applied Science
 AS – Associate of Science
 Bachelor
 BA – Bachelor of Arts
 BArch – Bachelor of Architecture
 BBA – Bachelor of Business Administration
 BSBA – Bachelor of Science of Business Administration
 BBiotech – Bachelor of Biotechnology
 BDS / BChD – Bachelor of Dental Surgery
 BDentTech – Bachelor of Dental Technology
 BDes – Bachelor of Design
 BD / BDiv – Bachelor of Divinity
 BEd – Bachelor of Education
 BEng – Bachelor of Engineering
 BEnvd – Bachelor of Environmental Design
 BFA – Bachelor of Fine Arts
 LLB – Bachelor of Laws
 BMath – Bachelor of Mathematics
 MB, ChB / MB, BS / BM, BCh / MB, BChir – Bachelor of Medicine, Bachelor of Surgery
 BMus – Bachelor of Music
 BN – Bachelor of Nursing
 BPhil – Bachelor of Philosophy
 STB – Bachelor of Sacred Theology
 BSc – Bachelor of Science
 BSN – Bachelor of Science in Nursing
 BSW – Bachelor of Social Work
 BTh / ThB – Bachelor of Theology
 BVSc – Bachelor of Veterinary Science
 Designer [Dz]
 Doctor
 DA – Doctor of Arts
 DBA – Doctor of Business Administration
 D.D. – Doctor of Divinity
 Ed.D. – Doctor of Education
 EngD or DEng – Doctor of Engineering
 DFA – Doctor of Fine Arts
 DMA – Doctor of Musical Arts
 D.Min. – Doctor of Ministry
 D.Mus. – Doctor of Music
 D.Prof – Doctor of Professional Studies
 DPA – Doctor of Public Administration
 D.Sc. – Doctor of Science
 JD – Doctor of Jurisprudence
 LL.D. – Doctor of Laws
 MD – Doctor of Medicine
 DO – Doctor of Osteopathic Medicine
 Pharm.D. – Doctor of Pharmacy
 Ph.D. / D.Phil. – Doctor of Philosophy
 PsyD – Doctor of Psychology
 SJD – Doctor of Juridical Science
 Th.D. – Doctor of Theology
 Doctorates within the field of medicine:
 DC
 DDS – Doctor of Dental Surgery
 DMD – Doctor of Dental Medicine
 O.D.
 DPT
 DPM
 DVM
 Master
 MArch – Master of Architecture
 MA – Master of Arts
 MAL – Master of Liberal Arts
 MBA – Master of Business Administration
 MPA – Master of Public Administration
 MPS – Master of Public Service
 MPl – Master of Planning
 MChem – Master in Chemistry
 MC – Master of Counselling
 M. Des – Master of Design
 M.Div. – Master of Divinity
 MDrama – Master of Drama
 MDS – Master of Dental Surgery
 MEd – Master of Education
 MET – Master of Educational Technology
 MEng – Master of Engineering
 MFA – Master of Fine Arts
 MHA – Master of Healthcare Administration
 MHist – Master of History
 MLitt - Master of Letters
 LL.M. – Master of Law
 MLA – Master of Landscape Architecture
 MMath – Master of Mathematics
 MPhil – Master of Philosophy
 MRes – Master of Research
 MSc – Master of Science
 MScBMC – Master of Biomedical Communications
 MPhys – Master of Physics
 MPharm – Master of Pharmacy
 MPH – Master of Public Health
 MSBA - Master of Science in Business Analytics
 MSE – Master of Science in Engineering
 MSRE – Master of Science in Real Estate
 MSW – Master of Social Work
 Magister – Magister
 S.T.M. – Master of Sacred Theology
 MTh/Th.M. – Master of Theology
 MURP – Master of Urban and Regional Planning

See also

 Byzantine aristocracy and bureaucracy
 Corporate title
 Ethiopian aristocratic and religious titles
 False titles of nobility
 Hereditary title
 Honorific
 Index of religious honorifics and titles
 List of titles
 Military rank
 Nobility
 Peerage
 Political institutions of Rome
 Post-nominal letters
 Pre-nominal letters
 Royal and noble ranks
 Royal and noble styles
 Suffix (name)
 Style (manner of address)
 Title of honor
 Titles held only by one person

Notes

References

Sources
 African Kings by Daniel Lainé
 Keepers of the Kingdom by Alastair Bruce, Julian Calder, and Mark Cator
 Master and Commander, film directed by Peter Weir

External links